The men's 81 kg competition of the weightlifting events at the 2019 Pan American Games in Lima, Peru, was held on July 28 at the Coliseo Mariscal Caceres.

Results
6 athletes from five countries took part.

New records

References

External links
Results

Weightlifting at the 2019 Pan American Games